Crawford Hall is the basketball and volleyball practice facility for UC Irvine Athletics. Crawford Court located in Crawford Hall is a 1,400-seat arena that houses the UC Irvine intercollegiate athletics offices, men's basketball, women's basketball, men's volleyball and women's volleyball teams practice facilities.

Background
The Crawford Hall Complex, in addition to housing the athletic administration offices and practice facilities, also includes sports medicine, strength and conditioning, and student-athlete academic support services. The complex includes Microsemi Field (formerly Crawford Field), a set of practice fields for the UC Irvine Anteaters soccer teams.  The facility's outdoor breezeway is also informally recognized within the UC Irvine community as the rehearsal space for hip hop dance team Kaba Modern.

History
Crawford Hall is one of nine original buildings designed by William Pereira that were present when the campus opened in 1965. Cased in cylindrical concrete panels and perched atop a small hill, it has a castle-like presence when viewed from the road. It is attached to a smaller administrative building by an arched, covered walkway which spans a landscaped courtyard between the two. Originally named Campus Hall, it served as a multi-purpose facility prior to construction of the first Student Center in the 1980s.

English rock band Led Zeppelin played an 11-song set at Crawford Hall on May 1, 1969.

Since 2016, the complex has been used by the Los Angeles Rams during their training camps at UC Irvine.

See also
Bren Events Center

References

External links
 Crawford Court
 Microsemi Field

University of California, Irvine main campus buildings and structures
UC Irvine Anteaters men's basketball
UC Irvine Anteaters women's basketball
UC Irvine Anteaters men's volleyball
Sports venues completed in 1965
Sports venues in Irvine, California
College basketball venues in the United States
College basketball practice facilities in the United States
Basketball venues in California
Volleyball venues in California
Indoor arenas in California
William Pereira buildings
College volleyball venues in the United States
University and college administration buildings in the United States
Brutalist architecture in California
Futurist architecture
Modernist architecture in California
1960s architecture in the United States
1965 establishments in California
University and college buildings completed in 1965